Bruno Kramm (born 13 October 1967, in Munich) is a German musician, known for programming, playing synthesizers and keyboards, co-fronting and performing backup vocals for the electro-industrial duo Das Ich, alongside Stefan Ackermann. Kramm is a multi-instrumentalist, singer-songwriter and founder of the German goth club, "Generation Gothic". He is also a record producer for a number of musical projects.

Known for his iconic "devil-horn hair", Kramm sports a dark outfit during performances in Das Ich, often being significantly more "made-up" than vocalist Ackermann. His vocals tend to bring up a deeper and more intense feel that contrast Stefan's fast-paced and shrill, exciting voice.

Bruno Kramm was an active member of the Pirate Party Germany and has been appointed by its board as federal commissioner on copyright issues. 
In September 2016 Kramm stepped down as party chairman and rejoined Alliance '90/The Greens.

See also
Das Ich
Stefan Ackermann

External links

Bruno Kramm and Generation Gothic – Official MySpace.com profile
Das Ich – Official website

References

1967 births
Living people
German keyboardists
German record producers
Pirate Party Germany politicians
Alliance 90/The Greens politicians